Jackson County Airport  is three miles northeast of Jefferson, in Jackson County, Georgia, United States.

In the year ending April 30, 2009 the airport had 9,550 aircraft operations, average 26 per day: 99.5% general aviation and 0.5% military.
55 aircraft were then based at this airport: 76% single-engine, 6% helicopter and 18% ultralight.

References

External links 
 Aerial photo as of 5 January 2000 from USGS The National Map
 
 

Airports in Georgia (U.S. state)
Buildings and structures in Jackson County, Georgia
Transportation in Jackson County, Georgia